Sun Rui (born 29 July 1995) is a Chinese singer, dancer, and actress. Sun started her career as a member of idol girl group SNH48, of which she was a member from 2013 to 2021.

Career
Sun took part in the audition for SNH48's second-generation members, and was one of 34 girls who qualified on August 18, 2013; on November 11, she was assigned to Team SII, of which she had been a member until 2021. On November 16, Sun participated in SNH48's first major concert, "SNH48 Guangzhou Concert", held in the Guangzhou International Sports Arena.

On April 20, 2016, Sun was announced as a member of Electroeyes Girls, a sub-unit which focuses on e-sports. From July 8 to August 12, Sun appeared on the third season of Chinese reality television series The Amazing Race China along with groupmate Huang Tingting, with their team being eliminated during the fifth leg.

Sun was ranked 18th with 35458.6 votes in SNH48 Group's fourth General Election, held on July 29, 2017, placing her among the Under Girls and marking the first time she ranked within the top few positions. The following year, she was announced as a member of the sub-unit BlueV along with Li Yuqi, Mo Han, Wan Lina and Lyu Yi during SNH48's fifth anniversary concert held on February 2, 2018; they released their debut EP MAMI on September 7. During SNH48 Group's fifth General Election on July 28, Sun came in 17th with 47733.14 votes, again placing her among the Under Girls.

During SNH48 Group's fifth General Election held on July 27, 2019, Sun came in 13th with 571,978 votes, subsequently she was featured on the title track of the group's EP Poetry About Time along with the top 16 members.

In March 2020, Sun participated in the second season of iQiYi's reality show Youth With You as a trainee under Star48 Culture Media. Despite not making it into girl group THE9 as a result of coming in 17th overall, the popularity she received from the show led to her coming in first with 3,533,525 votes during SNH48 Group's seventh General Election, held on August 15. As a reward, she released her solo debut EP Sugarfree on January 11, 2021.

In 2021, Sun marked her acting debut through her appearance in the Zhang Yibai-directed film The Day We Lit Up the Sky as one of its lead actors, with the film being released on July 17. On August 7, during SNH48's eighth General Election, Sun retained the top position with 3,123,409 votes, becoming the third member to be elevated to the Star Palace after Ju Jingyi and Li Yitong.

Discography

Albums

Singles

Soundtrack appearances

Filmography

Film

Variety shows

References

External links
 
 

1995 births
Living people
SNH48 members
Actresses from Harbin
Actresses from Heilongjiang
Singers from Heilongjiang
21st-century Chinese actresses
Chinese film actresses
Chinese television actresses
Chinese idols
Chinese Mandopop singers
People from Harbin
The Amazing Race contestants
Youth With You contestants